Mediafin is a Belgian media group. The company was established in 2005 when it was bought by De Persgroep and Rossel. Its name was switched from Publisher Tijd to Mediafin. De Persgroep and Rossel hold a fifty percent stake in Mediafin.

In 2018, De Persgroep sold its 50 percent stake in Mediafin to Flemish media group Roularta, who in return sold its 50 percent stake in Medialaan to De Persgroep for 217.5 million euros in cash.

The company is based in Brussels. It publishes two daily newspapers: De Tijd, in Dutch, and L'Echo, in French and two weekly magazines for investors: De Belegger, in Dutch, and L'Investisseur, in French.

References

External links
 Official website

2005 establishments in Belgium
Companies based in Brussels
Publishing companies established in 2005
Magazine publishing companies
Mass media companies of Belgium
Mass media in Brussels
Newspaper companies
Publishing companies of Belgium